The Universidad Tecmilenio (UTM) (Tecmilenio University) is a private institution of higher education. The institution is part of Monterrey Institute of Technology and Higher Education Tecmilenio University ITESM system comprises 40 locations and an online campus. For-profit schools that have entered the country in recent years, the university serves some 21,000 students on its own at high school, undergraduate and postgraduate level, frequently through distance learning. Like most schools it now follows a semester model that replaced the original four-month terms.

Campuses

 the university has 40 campuses distributed over several Mexican cities.

Chiapas
 Tapachula
 Chihuahua
 Camargo
 Chihuahua
 Cuauhtémoc
 Cd. Juárez
Parral
 Coahuila
 Torreón (Laguna)
 Colima
 Colima
 Durango
 Durango
 Jalisco
 Guadalajara (Guadalajara, Guadalajara Executive)
Zapopan
 Mexico City
 Ferrería and Reforma
 Michoacán
 Morelia
 Morelos
 Cuautla
Cuernavaca
 Nuevo León
 Guadalupe
 Monterrey (Cumbres, Las Torres)
 San Nicolás de los Garza
 Santa Catarina
 Puebla
 Puebla
 Querétaro
 Santiago de Querétaro
 San Juan del Río
 Quintana Roo
 Cancún
 San Luis Potosí
 San Luis Potosí
 Sinaloa
 Culiacán
 Los Mochis and Mazatlán
 Sonora
 Guaymas
 Hermosillo
 Navojoa
 Cd. Obregón
 State of México
 Tecoac
 Cuautitlán Izcalli and Toluca
 Tabasco
 Villahermosa
 Tamaulipas
 Matamoros 
 Reynosa
 Veracruz
 Veracruz
 Yucatán
 Mérida

According to John Auters of the Financial Times, most campuses have no extracurricular activities nor sports facilities to lower costs.

Organization

A national rectorate is based in Monterrey, Nuevo León, and oversees eight vice-rectorates:

Two internal vice-rectorates are in charge of academics and internal affairs.
Five regional vice-rectorates are in charge of all campuses in the northern, eastern, southern and western areas, as well as in the Monterrey Metropolitan Area.
A vice-rectorate is specialized in its distance education programs.

 the rector is Héctor Mauricio Escamilla Santana, who is being overseen by Salvador Alva, president of Tecnologico de Monterrey.

Programs

Tecmilenio University offers traditional and bilingual careers in areas of health sciences, humanities and social sciences, engineering, business and information technology. The masters cover three areas of study — humanities, business and information technology — and finally there is the continuing education which includes courses, seminars, certifications, among others.

Ranking
According to university ranking 2011 in the journal College Guide from the editors of Reader's Digest Tecmilenio University is in the top nine universities in Mexico.
Universidad Nacional Autónoma de México 1910  
Instituto Tecnológico y de Estudios Superiores de Monterrey 1943
Instituto Politécnico Nacional 1936 
Universidad Iberoamericana 1943  
Instituto Tecnológico Autónomo de México 1946  
Universidad Anáhuac 1964  
Universidad Tecmilenio 2002
Universidad de Guadalajara 1791  
Universidad Autónoma Metropolitana 1973

References

Private universities and colleges in Mexico
Distance education institutions based in Mexico
Educational institutions established in 2002
Monterrey Institute of Technology and Higher Education
2002 establishments in Mexico